Herzogiella is a genus of mosses belonging to the family Hypnaceae.

The genus name of Herzogiella is in honour of Theodor Carl Julius Herzog (1880– 1961), who was a German bryologist and phytogeographer.

The genus was circumscribed by Viktor Ferdinand Brotherus in Nat. Pflanzenfam. ed.2, vol.11 on page 466 in 1925.

The genus has almost cosmopolitan distribution.

Species: 
 Herzogiella adscendens Iwatsuki & W.B.Schofield, 1973 
 Herzogiella boliviana Fleischer, 1925 
 Herzogiella cylindricarpa (Cardot) Z. Iwats. 
 Herzogiella letestui (Dixon & P. de la Varde) Ando 
 Herzogiella perrobusta (Broth.) Z. Iwats. 
 Herzogiella renitens (Mitt.) Z. Iwats. 
 Herzogiella seligeri (Brid.) Z. Iwats. 
 Herzogiella striatella (Brid.) Z. Iwats. 
 Herzogiella turfacea (Lindb.) Z. Iwats.

References

Hypnaceae
Moss genera